At What Cost is the debut studio album by American hip hop recording artist GoldLink. It was released on March 24, 2017, by RCA Records. The album features guest appearances from Wale, Shy Glizzy, Steve Lacy, Jazmine Sullivan, Kaytranada, Mýa, Brent Faiyaz, Ciscero, Kokayi, Hare Squead, Radiant Children, April George and Lil Dude. The album has been critically acclaimed by fans and critics for its unique storytelling and production. The album has sold just over 500,000 copies, as of June 2021.

Background
In 2015, GoldLink released his second mixtape, And After That, We Didn't Talk on Soulection to critical acclaims. In 2016, it was announced that GoldLink had signed a major deal with RCA Records. To celebrate him signing to RCA, GoldLink and Soulection released a remixed version of And After That, We Didn't Talk. Later that year, he released his new single "Fall In Love" featuring fellow DC rapper and close friend Cisero, produced by BADBADNOTGOOD and Kaytranada.

Reception

At What Cost received positive reviews from critics. The album holds a score of 71/100 based on 5 reviews, indicating "generally favorable reviews".

Track listing

Notes
  signifies an additional producer.

Charts

Certifications

References 

GoldLink albums
RCA Records albums
Albums produced by Kaytranada
Albums produced by Steve Lacy